The 2016 Polish Speedway season was the 2016 season of motorcycle speedway in Poland.

Individual

Polish Individual Speedway Championship
The 2016 Individual Speedway Polish Championship final was held on 1 July at Leszno. Patryk Dudek won the Polish Championship.

Golden Helmet
The 2016 Golden Golden Helmet organised by the Polish Motor Union (PZM) was the 2016 event for the league's leading riders. The final was held at Tarnów on the  25 April. Patryk Dudek won the Golden Helmet.

Junior Championship
 winner - Daniel Kaczmarek

Silver Helmet
 winner - Krystian Pieszczek

Bronze Helmet
 winner - Bartosz Smektała

Pairs

Polish Pairs Speedway Championship
The 2016 Polish Pairs Speedway Championship was the 2016 edition of the Polish Pairs Speedway Championship. The final was held on 8 April at Rawicz.

Team

Team Speedway Polish Championship
The 2016 Team Speedway Polish Championship was the 2016 edition of the Team Polish Championship. Stal Gorzów Wielkopolski won the gold medal. The team included Bartosz Zmarzlik and Krzysztof Kasprzak.

Ekstraliga

Play offs

1.Liga

Play offs

References

Poland Individual
Poland Team
Speedway
2016 in Polish speedway